Paul Marshall House is a historic home located at Plattsburgh in Clinton County, New York.  It was built about 1828 and is a -story, stone-and-brick structure on a stone foundation in the Federal style.  It features a dressed stone facade and corbelled stone chimneys.

It was listed on the National Register of Historic Places in 1982.

References

Houses on the National Register of Historic Places in New York (state)
Federal architecture in New York (state)
Houses completed in 1828
Houses in Clinton County, New York
National Register of Historic Places in Clinton County, New York